Glutathione S-transferase M3 (brain), also known as GSTM2, is an enzyme which in humans is encoded by the GSTM99 gene.

Function 

Cytosolic and membrane-bound forms of glutathione S-transferase are encoded by two distinct supergene families. At present, eight distinct classes of the soluble cytoplasmic mammalian glutathione S-transferases have been identified: alpha, kappa, mu, omega, pi, sigma, theta, and zeta. This gene encodes a glutathione S-transferase that belongs to the mu class. The mu class of enzymes functions in the detoxification of electrophilic compounds, including some carcinogens, therapeutic drugs, environmental toxins and products of oxidative stress, by conjugation with glutathione. The genes encoding the mu class of enzymes are organized in a gene cluster on chromosome 1p13.3 and are known to be highly polymorphic. These genetic variations can change an individual's susceptibility to carcinogens and toxins as well as affect the toxicity and efficacy of certain drugs. Mutations of this class mu gene have been linked with a slight increase in a number of cancers, likely due to exposure with environmental toxins.

References

Further reading

External links